"Soldier" is a song recorded by Australian singer Samantha Jade. The song was digitally and physically released on 15 November 2013. "Soldier" was written by Jade, David Musumeci and Anthony Egizii, and produced by Musumeci and Egizii under their stage name DNA Songs. It became her fourth top twenty hit since winning The X Factor Australia in 2012. "Soldier" was certified Gold by the Australian Recording Industry Association for selling over 35,000 copies.

Background and production
"Soldier" was written by Jade with David Musumeci and Anthony Egizii, who also produced and mixed the song under their stage name DNA Songs. Jade spoke about "Soldier" in an interview with News.com.au, revealing that the track was inspired by the end of her seven-year relationship with Swedish music producer Christian Nilsson. "Soldier" was released physically on CD single and for digital download on 15 November 2013.

Track listing

Charts

Weekly charts

Year-end charts

Certifications

Release history

References

2013 singles
Samantha Jade songs
Songs written by Anthony Egizii
Songs written by David Musumeci
Sony Music Australia singles
2013 songs
Song recordings produced by DNA Songs
Songs written by Samantha Jade